Xie Shaoguang (born 15 September 1961), also known as Cha Shao-Kwong, is a Singaporean retired actor best known for acting in many Chinese-language television series produced by MediaCorp Channel 8. He was prominently a full-time Mediacorp artiste from 1989 to 2005.

Career and personal life
Since the start of his acting career in 1989 in the television series A Mother's Love, Xie has received numerous accolades, including winning the Star Awards Best Actor award five times and the Best Supporting Actor award twice since the ceremony's inception in 1994. In 2005, he was awarded the All-Time Favourite Artiste   award, in recognition of his career after winning the Top 10 Most Popular Male Artistes award from 1995-2004 respectively with Fann Wong. One of his most notable roles is the Chinese folk deity Ji Gong in the 1997 television series The Legends of Jigong.

In 2005, Xie formalised his plans to retire from the entertainment industry when he decided not to renew his contract which expired in September the same year, although his intention to quit has been made known years earlier. He said that after retirement, he would be living in Malaysia, where he planned to open a refuge for stray dogs and cats. His final appearance in the media was in the television series Baby Blues, which ended its run on 9 September 2005.

Since leaving the entertainment industry, Xie has rejected all requests to appear in public events or on screen, including an invitation by Singaporean director Anthony Chen to star in the award-winning film Ilo Ilo.

Xie moved to Permas Jaya, Malaysia, where he was ordained as a Buddhist monk in 2013. In 2014, Xie opened an animal welfare centre, Animal Paradise, in Pekan Nanas, Johor.

In 2016, Singaporean media reported that Xie has renounced as layman and became a head chef in a vegetarian restaurant.

After a 12-year hiatus, Xie made a short official media appearance on 14 October 2017 to conduct acting classes for younger actors. Xie has stated he would return to acting, if there is a role that can persuade him to do so.

Filmography

Television

Awards and nominations

References

External links
 Celeb Bio

Singaporean male television actors
Singaporean Buddhists
Living people
1961 births
Singaporean people of Hakka descent
People from Heshan